Purakkadi  is a village near Meenangadi in Wayanad district in the state of Kerala, India.

Demographics
 India census, Purakkadi had a population of 19955 with 10088 males and 9867 females.

Transportation
Purakkadi is 73 km by road from Kozhikode railway station and this road includes nine hairpin bends. The nearest major airport is at Calicut. The road to the east connects to Mysore and Bangalore. Night journey is allowed on this sector as it goes through Bandipur national forest. The nearest railway station is Mysore.  There are airports at Bangalore and Calicut.

References

Sultan Bathery area
Villages in Wayanad district